Bektemir Rozmatjon Ogli Meliqoziyev (born 13 April 1996) is an Uzbek professional boxer. As an amateur, he won a silver medal at the 2016 Summer Olympics as a middleweight.

Amateur career

Olympic result
Rio 2016
Round of 16: Defeated Daniel Lewis (Australia) 3–0
Quarter-finals: Defeated Vikas Krishan Yadav (India) 3–0
Semi-final: Defeated Misael Rodríguez (Mexico) 3–0
Final: Defeated by Arlen López (Cuba) 3–0

World Championship results
Doha 2015
Round of 32: Defeated Zaal Kvachatadze (Georgia) KO
Round of 16: Defeated Christian M'billi (France) 2–1
Quarter-finals: Defeated Petr Khamukov (Russia) 2–1
Semi-finals: Defeated Michael O'Reilly (Republic of Ireland) 2–1
Final: Defeated by Arlen López (Cuba) 2–1

Hamburg 2017
Round of 16: Defeated Muslim Gadzhimagomedov (Russia) 4–1
Quarter-finals: Defeated Yerik Alzhanov (Kazakhstan) 3–2
Semi-final: Defeated by Joe Ward (Republic of Ireland) 3–2

Professional career
On 13 June 2019, Melikuziev made his professional debut against the experienced Argentinian Martin Fidel Rios. Melikuziev won the bout after knocking Rios out with a left hand to the body in the opening round. Melikuziev's second bout as a professional was against Ricardo Adrian Luna Flores on 30 August 2019. Melikuziev secured a first round win after dropping his Mexican opponent on the canvas twice following a series of strong body shots, Melikuziev was declared the winner after Luna Flores was unable to recover from a second time on the canvas.

On 2 November 2019, Melikuziev fought professionally for a third time on the undercard of Canelo Álvarez vs Sergey Kovalev against Clay Collard. Melikuziev won via fourth round technical knockout after slowly wearing his opponent down with a number of heavy body shots. Melikuziev was taken the distance for the first time as a professional when he fought Vaughn Alexander on 13 December 2019. Melikuziev won via wide unanimous decision after winning every round on each of the three scorecards.

On 14 February 2020, Melikuziev fought against Oscar Cortes. In the opening round, Melikuziev put his opponent on the canvas with a right hand to the head. Cortes landed  few shots throughout the bout and Melikuziev eventually dropped his opponent for a second time in the round with a heavy shot to the body, following the second knock down, referee Edward Hernandez Sr called an end to the fight. Melikuziev's sixth professional fight was against Alan Campa on 30 October 2020. Melikuziev won via knockout in the third round.

Melikuziev had been scheduled to fight former light heavyweight champion Sergey Kovalev on 30 January 2021, but the bout was canceled when Kovalev tested positive for a banned substance. Melikuziev instead fought Morgan Fitch on 13 February 2021 and won via third-round knockout after knocking Fitch down twice in the bout.

On 19 June 2021, Melikuziev fought his toughest opponent yet, American veteran Gabriel Rosado. He dropped Rosado in the first round and looked to be in control of the fight, but Rosado unexpectedly caught Melikuziev in the third round with a powerful overhand right that sent him to the canvas. Melikuziev was unable to recover in time and he suffered a major upset loss, with commentators and analysts opining that the stoppage was a contender for Knockout of the Year.

Professional boxing record

References

External links
 
 
 
 
 

1996 births
Living people
Uzbekistani male boxers
Boxers at the 2014 Summer Youth Olympics
AIBA World Boxing Championships medalists
Olympic boxers of Uzbekistan
Boxers at the 2016 Summer Olympics
Olympic silver medalists for Uzbekistan
Olympic medalists in boxing
Medalists at the 2016 Summer Olympics
Youth Olympic gold medalists for Uzbekistan
Welterweight boxers
Middleweight boxers
Super-middleweight boxers
Light-heavyweight boxers
Southpaw boxers